Martin Jankovec (born 25 August 1987 in Trenčín) is a Slovak sprint canoeist. At the 2012 Summer Olympics, he competed in the Men's K-4 1000 metres, finishing in 6th place with the team in the final.

References

Slovak male canoeists
Living people
Olympic canoeists of Slovakia
Canoeists at the 2012 Summer Olympics
Sportspeople from Trenčín
1987 births
European Games competitors for Slovakia
Canoeists at the 2015 European Games